List of all mayors and lord mayors of London (leaders of the City of London Corporation, and first citizens of the City of London, from medieval times). Until 1354, the title held was Mayor of London. The dates are those of election to office (Michaelmas Day on 29 September, excepting those years when it fell on the Sabbath) and office is not actually entered until the second week of November. Therefore, the years 'Elected' below do not represent the main calendar year of service.

In 2006 the title Lord Mayor of the City of London was devised, for the most part, to avoid confusion with the office of Mayor of London. However, the legal and commonly used title and style remains Lord Mayor of London.

Mayors

before 1300

Notes

14th century

Notes

Lord mayors

14th century

Notes

15th century

Notes

16th century

17th century

18th century

19th century

Notes

20th century

21st century

See also
 Timeline of London
 List of sheriffs of London

Notes

References
 Lord Mayors of the City of London from 1189
 John Noorthouck (1773) 'Addenda: The Mayors and Sheriffs of London', A New History of London: Including Westminster and Southwark, pp. 889–893.
 Caroline M. Barron (n.d.) 'London in the Later Middle Ages: Government and People 1200–1500'
 CNL Brooke & G Keir (n.d.) 'London 800–1216:The Shaping of a City', p254
 James Clark Holt (n.d.) "Magna Carta", p56
 'Chronicles of the mayors and sheriffs of London, A.D. 1188 to A.D. 1274', translated from the original Latin and Anglo-Norman of the "Liber de antiquis legibus", in the possession of the corporation of the city of London

External links
 www.london-city-history.org.uk
 A List of the MAYORS and SHERIFFS of London from the earliest Accounts. from British History Online: Pages 889–893 of A New History of London Including Westminster and Southwark. Originally published by R Baldwin, London, 1773.
 The Mayors and Sheriffs of London database from University of Toronto

London, Lord Mayors of the City of
 
Lord Mayors
Lord Mayors